Workin' Out! with the Barney Kessel Quartet is an album by guitarist Barney Kessel recorded in 1961 and released on the Contemporary label.

Reception

The Allmusic review by Scott Yanow states: "Nothing all that unusual occurs, but the music is fine modern mainstream jazz from the early '60s".

Track listing
 "Good Li'l Man" (Marvin Jenkins) - 3:24
 "Summertime" (George Gershwin, DuBose Heyward) - 5:47
 "Spanish Scenery" (Barney Kessel) - 6:32
 "When Johnny Comes Marching Home" (Louis Lambert) - 6:20
 "New Rhumba" (Ahmad Jamal) - 5:45
 "My Man's Gone Now" (Gershwin, Heyward) - 6:31
 "My Funny Valentine" (Richard Rodgers, Lorenz Hart) - 4:47
 "Pedal Point" (Kessel) - 4:10

Personnel
Barney Kessel - guitar
Marvin Jenkins - piano, flute
Jerry Good - bass
Stan Popper - drums

References

Contemporary Records albums
Barney Kessel albums
1961 albums